Daniel Postgate (born 5 February 1964) is an English script writer, author, and illustrator. Some of his books include Smelly Bill, Engelbert Sneem and His Dream Vacuum Machine, and Big Mum Plum. In 2014, he collaborated with Oliver Postgate’s business partner and other founder of Smallfilms, Peter Firmin on the production of a new series of The Clangers, with Daniel Postgate writing many of the episodes and voicing the Iron Chicken, The Soup Dragon, and her son, Baby Soup Dragon. He won a Bafta for his episode 'I am the Eggbot'.  

After the death of his father in 2008, Postgate inherited Smallfilms, the company set up by Postgate and Firmin. Smallfilms is a company that has made Pingwings, Pogles' Wood, Noggin the Nog, Ivor the Engine, Clangers and Bagpuss, and was shown on the BBC between 1950s and 1980s, and on ITV from 1959 to the present day.

Early life 
Postgate was born in Whitstable Hospital on 5 February 1964. The youngest son of Oliver Postgate and Prudence Myers, nee Briton. Postgate grew up in Blean, a village just outside Whitstable, and lived in a large house which was once a pub. He attended the Canterbury Technical College.

Career 
After moving to London, Postgate regularly contributed his Cartoons to The Sunday Times newspaper . In 1993 he wrote and illustrated his first picture book, 'Kevin Saves the World'''.'' Postgate has subsequently written and illustrated many children's books (Big Mother Plum, Hairy Toe, Smelly Bill, Wild West Willy) and was a main writer for the CBeebies revival of the Clangers (2015–) which won a Bafta in 2015 for Postgate's script and he was nominated again the following year for best writer. Postgate references some of his illustrative influences as "Quentin Blake, Tony Ross, Maurice Sendak, Don Martin, Sempe and Dr Seuss"].

Personal life 
Postgate has worked as a chef, a painter of horses and sea scenes on old wooden boxes, a freelance cartoonist, and a picture book illustrator. Postgate has two children, a son and a daughter.

References

External links 

 › News

People from Whitstable
English children's writers
1964 births
Daniel
living people
People from Blean
21st-century English writers
21st-century English male writers